Cummings is a surname.

Notable people with the surname "Cummings" include

A
Abbott Lowell Cummings (1923–2017), American architectural historian
Albert Cummings (born 1968), American guitarist
Alexander Cummings (territorial governor) (1810–1879), American general and politician
Alexander B. Cummings Jr. (born 1956), Liberian politician
Alma Carrie Cummings (1857–1926), American journalist
Amos J. Cummings (1841–1902), American politician
Andrew Boyd Cummings (1830–1863), American army officer
Ann Cummings (born 1946), American businesswoman and politician
Anne Marie Cummings (born 1967), American actress
Ashleigh Cummings (born 1992), Australian actress
Aubrey Cummings (1947–2010), Guyanese musician

B
Bart Cummings (1927–2015), Australian racehorse trainer
Bill Cummings (disambiguation), multiple people
Brian Cummings (disambiguation), multiple people
Bruce Cummings (1927–1991), Canadian football player
Burtland Cummings (born 1965), Canadian football player
Burton Cummings (born 1947), Canadian songwriter
Byron Cummings (1860–1954), American archaeologist

C
Candy Cummings (1848–1924), American baseball player
Carol Cummings (born 1949), Jamaican sprinter
Chance Cummings (1892–1974), American baseball player
Charles Cummings (disambiguation), multiple people
Chester Cummings, American politician
Chris Cummings (born 1975), Canadian singer-songwriter
Chris A. Cummings (born 1969), Canadian musician
Clara Eaton Cummings (1855–1906), American botanist
Clarence Cummings (born 2000), American weightlifter
Claude Cummings (1917–1965), Australian rules footballer
Conrad Cummings (born 1948), American composer
Conrad Cummings (boxer) (born 1991), English boxer
Constance Cummings (1910–2005), American-British actress

D
Damon Cummings (disambiguation), multiple people
David Cummings (disambiguation), multiple people
D. C. Cummings (1861–1942), British trade unionist
Dean Cummings (born 1993), Scottish footballer
Denis Joseph Cummings (1885–1956), New Zealand policeman
Dominic Cummings (born 1971), British political strategist
Don Cummings, American playwright
Dorothy Smith Cummings (1903–1995), American archer
Douglas Cummings (1946–2014), British cellist

E
Ed Cummings (disambiguation), multiple people
Edith Cummings (1899–1984), American socialite
Edwin Cummings (1885–1951), New Zealand cricketer
E. E. Cummings (1894–1962), American poet
Eileen Cummings (born 1943), Australian politician
Elijah Cummings (1951–2019), American politician
Elisabeth Cummings (born 1934), Australian artist
Eliza Cummings (born 1991), English model
Emerson LeRoy Cummings (1902–1986), American army general
Emma G. Cummings (1856–1940), American horticulturalist
Emmanuel Cummings, British politician and colonist
Eric Douglas Cummings (1896–1979), Australian army pilot
Erin Cummings (born 1977), American actress
Eustace Henry Taylor Cummings (1890–1967), British doctor
Everald Cummings (born 1948), Trinidadian footballer

F
Felicia Cummings (born 1968), Trinidadian cricketer
Foster Cummings (born 1973), Trinidadian politician
Frank Cummings (1891–1954), Australian rower
Frank E. Cummings III (born 1938), American professor
Fred Cummings, American theoretical physicist
Fred N. Cummings (1864–1952), American politician

G
George Cummings (disambiguation), multiple people
Glen Cummings (disambiguation), multiple people
Grace Shimm Cummings (1865–1910), American educator

H
Harold Cummings (born 1992), Panamanian footballer
Harry S. Cummings (1866–1917), American lawyer
Henry J. B. Cummings (1831–1909), American politician
Herbert Wesley Cummings (1873–1956), American politician
Homer Stille Cummings (1870–1956), American politician
Horace H. Cummings (1858–1937), American educator and religious figure

I
Ida R. Cummings (1867–1958), American teacher
Iris Cummings (born 1920), American aviator
Irving Cummings (1888–1959), American actor
Ivor Cummings (1913–1992), British civil servant
Ivy Cummings (1901–1971), American stock car racing driver

J
Jack Cummings (disambiguation), multiple people
Jacob Abbot Cummings (1773–1820), American publisher
James Cummings (disambiguation), multiple people
Jane Cummings, English nurse
Jason Cummings (born 1995), Scottish footballer
Jeanne Cummings, American columnist
Jeffrey Cummings, American professor
Jeremiah Cummings (disambiguation), multiple people
Jeremy Cummings (born 1976), American baseball player
Jim Cummings (born 1952), American voice actor
Jim Cummings (filmmaker) (born 1986), American filmmaker
Jo Cummings (born 1998), English footballer
Joan Cummings (disambiguation), multiple people
Joe Cummings (disambiguation), multiple people
John Cummings (disambiguation), multiple people
Johnna Lee Cummings (born 1971), American pop singer
Joseph Cummings (1817–1890), American academic administrator
Joy Cummings (1923–2003), Australian politician
Joy Cummings (tennis) (born 1962), American tennis player

K
Karen Cummings, Guyanese politician
Kathleen Cummings (born 1961), American tennis player
Kenwin Cummings (born 1986), American football player
Keron Cummings (born 1988), Trinidadian footballer
Kevin Cummings (born 1990), American football coach

L
Laurence Cummings (born 1968), British organist
Leslie Cummings, American politician
Louise Duffield Cummings (1870–1947), Canadian-American mathematician

M
Mac Cummings (born 1979), American entrepreneur
Mack Cummings (born 1959), American football player
Marcus F. Cummings (1836–1905), American architect
Marian Cummings (1892–1984), American pilot
Marion Cummings (1876–1926), American philosopher
Markeith Cummings (born 1988), American basketball player
Martin Marc Cummings (1920–2011), American professor
Mary Cummings (1839–1927), American philanthropist
Maxwell Cummings (1898–2001), Canadian builder
Maya Rockeymoore Cummings (born 1971), American politician
Melvin Earl Cummings (1876–1936), American sculptor
Michael Cummings (1919–1997), English cartoonist
Michael A. Cummings (born 1945), American artist
Milton K. Cummings (1911–1973), American business executive
Midre Cummings (born 1971), American baseball player
Missy Cummings (born 1966), American professor
Monette Cummings (1914–1999), American writer

N
Nathan Cummings (1896–1985), American architect
Nicholas Cummings (1924–2020), American psychologist

O
Omar Cummings (born 1982), Jamaican footballer
Osmond Richard Cummings (1923–2013), American historian

P
Pat Cummings (disambiguation), multiple people
Paul Cummings (1953–2001), American long-distance runner
Percy Cummings (born 1946), Australian rules footballer
Peter Cummings (disambiguation), multiple people
Phil Cummings, Australian author
Philip Cummings (1906–1991), American public speaker
Priscilla Cummings (born 1951), American author

Q
Quinn Cummings (born 1967), American businesswoman

R
Ray Cummings (1887–1957), American writer
Richard Cummings (disambiguation), multiple people
Robert Cummings (disambiguation), multiple people
Ron Cummings, Canadian litigator
Roy Thomas Cummings (1930–1976), Canadian politician
Ruth Cummings (1894–1984), American screenwriter

S
Samuel Cummings (1927–1998), American arms dealer
Samuel Ray Cummings (born 1944), American judge
Scott Cummings (disambiguation), multiple people
Seán Cummings (born 1968), Canadian playwright
Shane Jiraiya Cummings (born 1974), Australian author
Sharain Cummings, Trinidadian footballer
Shaun Cummings (born 1989), English footballer
Stephanie Cummings, American politician
Stephen Cummings (born 1954), Australian singer-songwriter
Steve Cummings (born 1981), English cyclist
Steven Cummings (disambiguation), multiple people
Stuart Cummings (born 1960), English rugby union referee
Susan Cummings (disambiguation), multiple people
Sydney Cummings (born 1999), American-Guyanese footballer

T
Taylor Cummings (born 1994), American lacrosse player
Terry Cummings (born 1961), American basketball player
Theodore E. Cummings (1907–1982), American ambassador
Thomas Cummings (disambiguation), multiple people
Tim Cummings (born 1973), American actor
T. J. Cummings (born 1981), American basketball player
Tobias Cummings, Australian singer-songwriter
Tommy Cummings (1928–2009), English footballer
Tony Cummings, American magazine editor
Travis Cummings (born 1972), American politician
Trent Cummings (born 1973), Australian footballer

V
Vera Cummings (1891–1940), New Zealand artist
Veronica Cummings (born 1973), American swimmer
Vonteego Cummings (born 1976), American basketball player

W
Walter J. Cummings Jr. (1916–1999), American politician
Warren Cummings (born 1980), Scottish footballer
Whitney Cummings (born 1982), American comedian
William Cummings (disambiguation), multiple people

Z
Zak Cummings (born 1984), American mixed martial artist

See also
Cumings (surname), a page for people with the surname "Cumings"
Cumming (surname), a page for people with the surname "Cumming"
Cummins (surname), a page for people with the surname "Cummins"
Senator Cummings (disambiguation), a disambiguation page for Senators surnamed "Cummings"

English-language surnames